Für immer (German for forever) may refer to:

"Für immer" (Die Ärzte song), 1986
"Für immer" (Warlock song), 1987
Für Immer (video), a double DVD video album by former Warlock singer Doro Pesch
"Für Immer", a song by Neu!
"Für immer", a song by Böhse Onkelz from Weiß
Für immer (D.A.F. album), 1982
"Für immer" (Unheilig song)
Für immer, a 2019 album by Seiler und Speer

See also
Forever (disambiguation)